Eric Otto Gehrig (born December 25, 1987) is an American former soccer player who was most recently an assistant coach for Chicago Fire of MLS.

Career

College and amateur
Gehrig played for Ajax FC Chicago then  Loyola University Chicago from 2006-2009. Gehrig was a three-time All-Horizon League player. He appeared in all 78 of the Ramblers' matches in that time, and captained the team for three years.

Professional
Eric Gehrig was signed by Columbus Crew on March 17, 2011. He made his MLS regular season debut on June 26, 2011 against the Colorado Rapids, coming on as a sub in the 85th minute for Emmanuel Ekpo. He also started and played all 90 minutes in an Open Cup third round match against the Richmond Kickers on June 28, 2011. Gehrig made his first career MLS regular season start and played all 90 minutes in a 1-0 win at Vancouver on July 6, 2011.

On December 10, 2014, Gehrig was the 10th round pick in the 2014 MLS Expansion Draft by Orlando City SC, promptly being traded to Chicago Fire for a second-round selection in the 2016 MLS SuperDraft.

Gehrig went on to start 25 games for the Chicago Fire and was named 2015 Fire Defender of the Year. On November 23, 2016 Gehrig's contract option was not exercised by Chicago Fire.  He became eligible for the Re-Entry Draft but wasn't selected.  On February 15, 2017 Gehrig announced his retirement.  On the same day he was named assistant coach for Chicago Fire.

References

External links
 Loyola profile
 

1987 births
Living people
American soccer players
Loyola Ramblers men's soccer players
Chicago Fire U-23 players
Columbus Crew players
Chicago Fire FC players
Saint Louis FC players
Association football defenders
People from Harvey, Illinois
Soccer players from Illinois
USL League Two players
Major League Soccer players
USL Championship players
Chicago Fire FC non-playing staff